Tonnes and Tønnes are Danish diminutive forms of the name Antonius. The former is an alternative form of the name Antoni that is used in Denmark and Greenland, while the latter is also a Norwegian diminutive forms of the name Antonius, like Tonne, that is used as an alternate form of the name Tönius that is used in Denmark, Greenland and Norway. Notable people with this name include the following:

Given name
Tønnes Andenæs (1923–1975), Norwegian jurist, book publisher and politician
Tønnes Oksefjell (1901–1976), Norwegian politician
Tønnes Stang Rolfsen (born 1988), Norwegian luger

Stage name
Ten Tonnes (born 1996), stage name of Ethan Barnett, British singer-songwriter

See also

Tönnes Björkman (1888–1959), Swedish sport shooter
Tonnes, Norway
Tonne (name)
Tonnis
Townes (disambiguation)
Totnes (disambiguation)

Notes

Danish masculine given names
Norwegian masculine given names